October Tide is a Swedish death/doom metal band that was created in 1994 by Katatonia vocalist Jonas Renkse and then-Katatonia guitarist Fred Norrman. Norrman revived the band after leaving Katatonia in 2009.

History

1995–1999 
October Tide's debut album, Rain Without End, was recorded in 1995 and released on Vic Records in 1997. During this period October Tide maintained a low profile, deciding not to tour or give any interviews.

October Tide's second album, Grey Dawn, was released in 1999 by Avantgarde Music. The band enlisted Mårten Hansen of A Canorous Quintet to replace Renkse on vocals. The album was remastered and re-released by Peaceville Records in 2007. After the release of Grey Dawn, October Tide disbanded.

2009–2011 
After leaving Katatonia, Norrman reformed October Tide in early 2009. The new line-up didn't include founding member Jonas Renkse, but instead consisted of Norrman on guitars, Tobias Netzell on vocals, Robin Bergh on drums and Jonas Kjellgren as a session bassist. The band entered the studio to record a new album. October Tide signed to Candlelight Records in March 2010.

In July 2010, October Tide performed live at Hell's Pleasure Metalfest. Johan Jansson replaced Kjellgren on bass for the show.

A Thin Shell was released on 28 September 2010. After the album's release, Pierre Stam joined the band on bass.

2012–present 
In March 2012, Netzell and Stam left the band, and were replaced by Alexander Högbom and Mattias Norrman, respectively. October Tide signed with Pulverised Records in April 2012. The band entered Black Lounge Studios in late 2012 to record their new album, Tunnel of No Light. They released the album on 25 March 2013.

In 2015, drummer Robin Bergh was replaced by Jocke Wallgren.

Members

Current members 
 Fred Norrman –  bass (1994–1999), guitar (1994–1999; 2009–present)
 Mattias "Kryptan" Norrman – bass (2011–2016) guitar (2016-present)
 Alexander Högbom – vocals (2012–present)
 Johan Jönsegård – bass (2016-present)
 Jonas Sköld – drums (2016-present)

Past members 
 Jonas Renkse – vocals (1994–1998), drums, guitar (1994–1999)
 Mårten Hansen – vocals (1998–1999)
 Tobias Netzell – vocals (2009–2012)
 Pierre Stam – bass (2010–2012)
 Johan "Jonken" Jansson – live bass (2010)
 Robin Bergh – drums (2009–2014)
 Jocke Wallgren – drums (2014–2016)
 Emil Alstermark – guitar (2010–2016)

Timeline

Discography

Demo 
 Promo Tape (1995)

Albums 
 Rain Without End (1997 – Vic Records, 2008 – reissued with new artwork)
 Grey Dawn (1999 – Avantgarde Music, 2007 – reissued by Peaceville Records)
 A Thin Shell (2010 – Candlelight Records)
 Tunnel of No Light (2013 – Pulverised Records)
 Winged Waltz (2016 – Agonia Records)
 In Splendor Below (2019)

References

External links 

 Official website
 Interview with Jonas Renkse at Chronicles of Chaos
 Guitarist Uncut: Interview With Anders Nystrom, Katatonia

Swedish death metal musical groups
Swedish doom metal musical groups
Musical groups established in 1995
Musical groups disestablished in 1999
Musical groups reestablished in 2009